Hold Your Hands is a 2017 Chinese drama film written and directed by Miao Yue and starring Wang Xueqi and Chen Jin. The film premiered in China on October 13, 2017. The film follows the story of a veteran leading villagers out of poverty and into wealth in Xiangxi Tujia and Miao Autonomous Prefecture, central China's Hunan province. It is produced jointly by Xiaoxiang Film Group Co., Ltd., Emei Film Group Co., Ltd. and Huaxia Film Distribution.

Cast
 Wang Xueqi as Yang Yingjun, an ex-serviceman.
 Chen Jin as Sister Ma, Yang's wife.
 Mo Yang as Xiao Long, a volunteer.
 Bai Wei
 Chen Xibei
 Bardon
 Sun Min
 Ngawang Rinchen

Production
In November 2013, Chinese Communist Party general secretary Xi Jinping visited the remote village Shibadong, he proposed to take targeted measures in poverty alleviation for the first time.

Production started on April 28, 2017 and ended on September 28 of that same year. The film took place in Shuanglong Town of Huayuan County.

Release
On September 26, 2017, the first official trailer for the film was released along with a teaser poster.

The film premiered in Beijing on October 9, 2017 with wide-release in China on October 13, 2017.

Accolades

References

External links
 
 

2017 films
Films shot in Hunan
Films set in Hunan
2010s Mandarin-language films
Chinese drama films
2017 drama films